Alma Allen may refer to:

 Alma Allen (resistance member), member of the Danish resistance against the Nazis in World War II in the early 1940s and later joined British intelligence
 Alma Allen (artist) (born 1970), American sculptor
 Alma Allen (politician) (born 1939), American politician